Thomas Mun (c. 1645 – 15 February 1692) was an English politician. He was a Member of Parliament (MP) for Hastings from 1681 to 1685 and again from 1689 to 1690.

Life
He was the son of John Mun (1615–1670), who was the son of Thomas Mun the writer on economics. He inherited Snailham in Icklesham, Sussex.

He was M.P. for Hastings in the last parliament of Charles II, held at Oxford in 1681, and again in the Convention parliament, 1689. As one of the barons of the Cinque ports he also represented Hastings at the coronations of James II, 1685, and of William and Mary. In May 1689 he, with the Hon. Sir Vere Fane, K.B. and John Farthing, esq., petitioned the king for an improvement in the management of the excise.

He was buried at Bearsted on 15 February 1692. He had eleven children.

References

Attribution

1645 births
1692 deaths
English MPs 1681
English MPs 1689–1690
People from Icklesham